This is a list of public art in Kyiv, Ukraine. This list applies only to works of public art accessible in an outdoor public space. For example, this does not include artworks in museums.

References 

Kyiv
Culture in Kyiv
Lists of tourist attractions in Ukraine
Public art
Public art